Harry Burrard may refer to:

Sir Harry Burrard, 1st Baronet, of Walhampton (1707–1791), British politician
Sir Harry Burrard, 1st Baronet, of Lymington  (1755–1813), British general during the Peninsular War, nephew of Sir Harry Burrard, 1st Baronet, of Walhampton
Sir Harry Burrard-Neale, 2nd Baronet (1765–1840), born Harry Burrard, British Royal Navy officer and politician, also a nephew of Sir Harry Burrard, 1st Baronet, of Walhampton
Sir Harry Burrard, 5th Baronet (1818–1871), of the Burrard baronets
Sir Harry Paul Burrard, 6th Baronet (1846–1933), of the Burrard baronets

See also
Burrard (surname)